Dalqılınclı is a village in the Kalbajar District of Azerbaijan.

References

Populated places in Kalbajar District